The Tunisian Basketball Cup or in (Arabic language : كأس تونس لكرة السلة) is an annual professional men's basketball cup competition that takes place between clubs from Tunisia.

Tunisian Cup champions

Finals

Final MVP
Every season a player is named the most valuable player (MVP) of the final.

Titles by club

References

External links
Tunisian Basketball Federation Official Site 
AfricaBasket.com Tunsian Basketball League Page

Basketball cup competitions in Africa
Basketball competitions  in Tunisia